Battle of Pusan may refer to:

 Battle of Pusan Perimeter (1950) a land siege battle of the Korean War
 Battle of Korea Strait (Battle of Pusan Strait; 1950) a naval battle of the Korean War
 Battle of Pusan (1597)
 Battle of Pusan (1592)
 Siege of Pusan (1592)